The Pine Bluff Civic Center is the center of municipal government for the city of Pine Bluff, Arkansas. It is located at 200 East 8th Avenue in downtown Pine Bluff. The building is a colonnaded complex of three structures, designed by Arkansas architects Edward Durell Stone and his son Edward Jr., and built from 1963 to 1968.  It was the only such civic commission of the elder Stone in his native state, and followed his 1959 groundbreaking work on the United States Embassy in New Delhi.

The center was listed on the National Register of Historic Places in 2005.

See also

National Register of Historic Places listings in Jefferson County, Arkansas

References

Buildings and structures in Pine Bluff, Arkansas
City and town halls on the National Register of Historic Places in Arkansas
City halls in Arkansas
National Register of Historic Places in Pine Bluff, Arkansas